Lokanayak Omeo Kumar Das College, abbreviated as LOKD College is a general degree undergraduate, coeducational college situated in Dhekiajuli, Assam established in 1970. This college is affiliated with the Gauhati University.

History 
LOKD College was established on 15 July 1970. During its inception it was named Dhekiajuli College but later on, in the year 1975, it was renamed to Lokanayak Omeo Kumar Das College after Late Omeo Kumar Das, the first Education Minister of Assam in Independent India.

At present it imparts education to more than 3500 students with three faculties: Arts, Science and Commerce. The college is affiliated to Gauhati University.

Originally, the college offered education in higher secondary and degree only in Arts. However, in the latter part of the eighties, the need for the Science was strongly felt and in 1992 the college introduced the Science faculty with well-equipped laboratory facilities. To meet the growing demand opened by the corporate enterprises, the college started the B.Com Three Years Degree Course in the session 2010–11. The college maintains the Commerce Stream mainly from its own generated economic resources.

Geography 
The college is situated at the gateway of Dhekiajuli by NH-15 in a 16-acre-plot.

Motto 
The motto of the college is: tamasho ma jyotirgamai, which translates to "lead us from darkness to light".

Departments

Science 
Physics
Mathematics
Chemistry
Statistics
Botany
Zoology

Arts and Commerce
 Assamese
 Bengali
 Nepali
 Bodo
 English
Hindi
History
Education
Economics
Philosophy
Political Science
Commerce

Student Council 
The elections for the posts in the student council take place once in a year, most likely in the month of September.

References

Universities and colleges in Assam
Colleges affiliated to Gauhati University
Educational institutions established in 1970
1970 establishments in Assam